Bill Martin (born 1956) is a professor of philosophy at DePaul University whose academic work concerns Derrida, Sartre, Marxist theory, Aesthetics, and critiques of Richard Rorty. Martin has also written on progressive rock bands including Yes.

Works

"Avant Rock: Experimental Music from the Beatles to Björk"
"Humanism and Its Aftermath: The Shared Fate of Deconstruction and Politics"
"Marxism and the Call of the Future: Conversations on Ethics, History, and Politics" co-written with Bob Avakian.
"Matrix and Line: Derrida and the Possibilities of Postmodern Social Theory"
"Music of Yes: Structure and Vision in Progressive Rock"
"Listening to the Future: The Time of Progressive Rock, 1968–1978"
"Politics in the Impasse: Explorations in Postsecular Social Theory"
"The radical project: Sartrean investigations"
"Ethical Marxism: The Categorical Imperative of Liberation (Creative Marxism)"
"Into the Wild: Badiou, actually-existing Maoism, and the “vital mix” of yesterday and tomorrow"

See also

 American philosophy
 List of American philosophers

References

External links
DePaul bio of Bill Martin. retrieved 15th Feb 2010.
Review of "Humanism and its Aftermath" by John Hutnyk

1956 births
Living people
American Maoists
American writers about music
American philosophers
Continental philosophers
DePaul University faculty
Marxist theorists